The 1993 Torneo Godó was the 41st edition of the Torneo Godó annual tennis tournament played on clay courts in Barcelona, Catalonia, Spain and it took place from 5 April until 11 April 1993.

Finals

Singles

 Andrei Medvedev defeated  Sergi Bruguera, 6–7, 6–3, 7–5, 6–4

Doubles

 Shelby Cannon /  Scott Melville defeated  Sergio Casal /  Emilio Sánchez, 7–6, 6–1

References